The 2005 end of year tests, also known as the 2005 Autumn Internationals, refers to several international rugby union matches that took place during November/December period between touring teams from the southern hemisphere – Australia, Argentina, New Zealand and South Africa – and one or more teams from the Six Nations Championship: England, France, Ireland, Italy, Scotland and Wales. South Pacific team also tour the northern hemisphere as well as tier 2 European sides.

Wales had the main headline during the tests after beating Australia 24-22, their first victory over Australia since the third place match in the 1987 Rugby World Cup.

New Zealand completed a grand slam tour, their first since 1978.

Week 1

Week 2

Week 3

Week 4

Week 5

See also
 End of year rugby union tests
 Mid-year rugby union tests
 2005 South Africa rugby union tour of Argentina and Europe
 2005 New Zealand rugby union tour of Britain and Ireland
 2005 Australia rugby union tour of Europe
 2005 Argentina rugby union tour of Scotland and Italy
 2005 Tonga rugby union tour of Italy and France
 2005 Canada rugby union tour of France and Romania
 2005 Fiji rugby union tour of Europe
 2005 Samoa rugby union tour of Britain and Argentina

References

2005
2005–06 in European rugby union
2005 in Oceanian rugby union
2005 in North American rugby union
2005 in South American rugby union
2005 in South African rugby union